Valeriya Vladimirovna Demidova (born 3 March 2000) is a Russian freestyle skier. She competed in the 2018 Winter Olympics in the women's halfpipe.

World Cup podiums

Individual podiums
 1 wins
 5 podiums

Season titles
 1 title

References

External links

2000 births
Living people
Freestyle skiers at the 2018 Winter Olympics
Russian female freestyle skiers
Olympic freestyle skiers of Russia
21st-century Russian women